Luidjino Martir Hojer (born 5 February 1988) known as Luidjino Hoyer, is a Curaçaoan footballer who plays as a midfielder for Magreb '90 in the Dutch Topklasse and for the Curaçao national team.

Club career
Born in Santa Rosa, Curaçao, Netherlands Antilles, Hoyer began his career with  S.V. Victory Boys in the Sekshon Pagá, the highest level of football in Curaçao. He parted with the club after six seasons, playing for RKSV Centro Dominguito, whom he helped to their fourth national championship in 2015 winning the FKK Player of the Year award in the process. He then relocated to the Netherlands, signing with V.V. Magreb '90, competing in the Topklasse, the third tier of professional football in the Netherlands. He made his debut on 23 August 2015 in a 2–0 away win against FC Lienden.

International career
Hoyer plays for the national team of Curaçao, on 19 August 2011, Hoyer made his first appearance for Curaçao in the countries first official match after the dissolution of the Netherlands Antilles, a friendly encounter against the Dominican Republic ending in a 1–0 loss. He also played in the ABCS Tournament, the 2014 Caribbean Cup and the 2018 FIFA World Cup qualification.

Career statistics

International performance
Statistics accurate as of matches played on 8 September 2015,

Honors

Club
RKSV Centro Dominguito
 Sekshon Pagá (1): 2015

Individual
FFK Player of the Year: 2015

References

External links

1988 births
Living people
People from Santa Rosa, Curaçao
Dutch Antillean footballers
Curaçao footballers
Curaçao international footballers
Sekshon Pagá players
Association football midfielders
Derde Divisie players
Magreb '90 players
Curaçao youth international footballers
RKSV Centro Dominguito players
S.V. Victory Boys players